Andrew Sims (born October 19, 1982), better known mononymously as Sims, is an American rapper from Minneapolis. He has been a member of Doomtree and Shredders.

Early life
Sims was born Andrew Sims on October 19, 1982 in Minnesota. He grew up in Hopkins, a suburb of Minneapolis. His parents were former musicians. He first began creating music at an early age when his father bought him a Casio SK-1 keyboard. At a young age, he began writing lyrics, not necessarily rap. By the time he was 14, Sims was freestyle rapping and was also in various non hip hop bands as well. He attended Hopkins High School in Minnetonka, Minnesota, where he met P.O.S and Cecil Otter, (and later other Doomtree members) who would sell beats to Sims. Following graduation, he studied at the University of Minnesota, before dropping out with seventeen credits remaining. Although he was younger than his cohorts, after a while he was invited to become an official member of Doomtree, being the last one to join.

Career
Sims released the False Hopes Number Four EP, the fourth in a series of Doomtree's False Hopes releases, in 2003. In 2005, he released his first solo album, Lights Out Paris. The album was released without the help of a record label or distribution, instead using money earned from Doomtree's shows, who would release the album independently. In 2009, he released False Hopes XIV.

His second solo album, Bad Time Zoo, was released in 2011. It is entirely produced by Lazerbeak. The album was released with music videos for the tracks "One Dimensional Man", "LMG", and "Burn It Down." The album features a guest appearance from P.O.S. Drew Beringer of AbsolutePunk described the album as "one of the most bombastic hip-hop albums of 2011." City Pages included it on the "Minnesota's Best Albums of 2011" list. Sims released the Wildlife EP later that year.

In 2014, he released the Field Notes EP. It features production from Cecil Otter and Icetep, as well as a guest appearance from Astronautalis. In 2016, he released his solo album, More Than Ever. In 2018, he released a collaborative album with Air Credits and Icetep, titled Artería Verité.

Personal life
In 2010, Sims' wife Sarah (then girlfriend) needed an emergency pancreas transplant. During the Doomtree's Blowout Three concert, she was in a coma. Sims' experience is documented in a hidden song on "Hey You" on Bad Time Zoos CD and vinyl release. In 2011, they married.

Discography

Studio albums
 Lights Out Paris (2005)
 Bad Time Zoo (2011)
 More Than Ever (2016)
 Artería Verité (2018)

EPs
 False Hopes Number Four (2003)
 False Hopes XIV (2009)
 Wildlife (2011)
 Field Notes (2014)

Singles
 "Burn It Down" (2011)
 "This Is the Place" (2013) 
 "Triple 6's" (2016)
 "One Hundred (Air Credits Remix)" (2017)
 "No Getaway" (2017)
 "Time Don't Fear Me Back" (2017)
 "Cannon" (2018)

Guest appearances
 P.O.S - "Lifetime...Kid Dynamite" from Ipecac Neat (2004)
 Dessa - "Press On" from False Hopes (2005)
 Mel Gibson and the Pants - "Landmarked" from W/ Guitar (2005)
 Mel Gibson and the Pants - "Dead Baby Joke" from Sea vs. Shining Sea (2007)
 P.O.S - "Low Light Low Life" from Never Better (2009)
 Astronautalis - "Thomas Jefferson" from This Is Our Science (2011)
 Culture Cry Wolf - "Second Wind" from Dia de los Muertos (2011)
 The Hood Internet - "One for the Record Books" from FEAT (2012)
 P.O.S - "They Can't Come" from We Don't Even Live Here (2012)
 Big Quarters - "Grown Up" from Somos No Joke (2012)
 Transit - "Monster See Monster Do" from Occupy Tall Trees (2015)
 Air Credits - "Gear Shiftn" and "No Limits" from Broadcasted (2016)
 Four Fists - "Annihilation" from 6666 (2018)
 Ultra Suede - "Caldera" and "Diamonds" from Ultra Suede (2018)

References

External links
 
 Sims at Doomtree
 

1982 births
Living people
Rappers from Minneapolis
American rappers
Doomtree members
21st-century American rappers
Hopkins High School alumni